Scalesville is an unincorporated community in Lane Township, Warrick County, in the U.S. state of Indiana.

History
A post office was established at Scalesville in 1879, and remained in operation until 1903. William Scales served as an early postmaster.

Geography

References

Unincorporated communities in Warrick County, Indiana
Unincorporated communities in Indiana